Kevin Davidson (born August 1, 1997) is a former American football quarterback. He played college football for the Princeton Tigers.

High school career 
Davidson went to San Ramon Valley High School and was a three star recruit coming out of high school. In July 2015, Davidson committed to play football at University of California Davis. Davidson later uncommitted and on February 3, 2016, committed to play football for Princeton University.

College career 
Davidson saw little playing time at Princeton until he earned the starting quarterback job his senior season. On September 28, 2019, Davidson set an Ivy League record for touchdown passes in a game after throwing seven touchdowns against Bucknell. Davidson played in the 2020 East-West Shrine Bowl on January 18, 2020.

Statistics

Professional career 
After going undrafted in the 2020 NFL Draft, Davidson signed with the Cleveland Browns as an undrafted free agent on May 5, 2020. He was waived by the Browns on September 5, 2020.

Personal life 
Davidson is the son of Rob and Jennifer Davidson. He has an older brother, Kurt, and a younger brother, Kyle.

References 

Living people
1997 births
Players of American football from California
American football quarterbacks
Princeton Tigers football players
Sportspeople from the San Francisco Bay Area
Cleveland Browns players
People from Danville, California